This article serves as an index – as complete as possible – of all the honorific orders or similar decorations awarded by Selangor, classified by Monarchies chapter and Republics chapter, and, under each chapter, recipients' countries and the detailed list of recipients.

Awards

MONARCHIES

Selangor Royal Family 
They have been awarded :

 Sharafuddin of Selangor :
  Grand Master (since 21 November 2001) and First Class (DK I, 14.3.1970) of the Royal Family Order of Selangor
  Grand Master (since 21 November 2001) and Knight Grand Commander (SPMS, 6.6.1961) of the Order of the Crown of Selangor with title Dato' Seri
  Founding Grand Master and Knight Grand Companion of the Order of Sultan Sharafuddin Idris Shah (SSIS, since 14 December 2002) with title Dato' Setia
  Grand Master of the Order of Sultan Salahuddin Abdul Aziz Shah (since 21 November 2001)
 Tengku Amir Shah, Crown Prince of Selangor : 
  Knight Grand Commander of the Order of the Crown of Selangor  (SPMS, 11.12.2005) with title Dato' Seri 
  Knight Grand Companion of the Order of Sultan Sharafuddin Idris Shah (SSIS, 2010) with title Dato' Setia 
 Tengku Sulaiman Shah, eldest younger brother of Sultan Sharafuddin
  First Class of the Royal Family Order of Selangor (DK I)
  Knight Grand Commander of the Order of the Crown of Selangor  (SPMS, 8.3.1983) with title Dato' Seri
 Tunku Kamariah, Tengku Sulaiman Shah's wife :
  First Class of the Royal Family Order of Selangor (DK I)
 Tengku Abdul Samad Shah, second younger brother of Sultan Sharafuddin
  Knight Grand Companion of t the Order of Sultan Salahuddin Abdul Aziz Shah (SSSA) with title Dato' Seri
 Tengku Ahmad Shah, third younger brother of Sultan Sharafuddin
  Knight Grand Companion of t the Order of Sultan Salahuddin Abdul Aziz Shah (SSSA) with title Dato' Seri
  Knight Commander of the Order of the Crown of Selangor (DPMS) with title Dato'''
 Tengku Nur Zihan, youngest sister of Sultan Sharafuddin
  Knight Grand Companion of the Order of Sultan Sharafuddin Idris Shah (SSIS, 11.12.2002) with title Datin Paduka Setia Tengku Putra, cousin of Sultan Sharafuddin :
  Knight Grand Companion of the Order of Sultan Sharafuddin Idris Shah (SSIS,12 December 2015) with title Dato' Setia  Knight Companion of the Order of Sultan Salahuddin Abdul Aziz Shah (DSSA, 3 April 1993) with title Dato'  Companion  of the Order of Sultan Salahuddin Abdul Aziz Shah (SSA, 7 September 1985)
 STATES of MALAYSIA 

  Johor Royal Family 
They have been awarded :

 Sultan Ibrahim Ismail of Johor :
  First Class of the Royal Family Order of Selangor (DK I, 13.01.2011) 

  Kelantan Royal Family 
They have been awarded:

 Muhammad V of Kelantan, Sultan of Kelantan (since 13 September 2010) :
  First Class of the Royal Family Order of Selangor (DK I, 11.12.2010)
 Ismail Petra of Kelantan, Sultan Muhammad V of Kelantan's father and retired Sultan for illness :
  First Class of the Royal Family Order of Selangor (DK I, 13.11.1988)
 Raja Perampuan Anis, Sultan Muhammad V of Kelantan's mother :
  Second Class of the Royal Family Order of Selangor (DK II)

  Negeri Sembilan Royal Family 
They have been awarded :

 Muhriz of Negeri Sembilan 
  First Class of the Royal Family Order of Selangor (DK I, 11.12.2009)
 Tunku Naquiyuddin, Tunku Laksamana, elder son and second child of late Yang di-Pertuan Besar Jaafar of Negeri Sembilan :
  Knight Grand Commander of the Order of the Crown of Selangor  (SPMS) with title Dato' Seri  Pahang Royal Family 
 Ahmad Shah of Pahang :
  First Class of the Royal Family Order of Selangor (DK I, 16.7.1987)

  Perak Royal Family 
They have been awarded :

 Tuanku Bainun :
  First Class of the Royal Family Order of Selangor (DK I, 11.12.2005)
 Sultan Raja Nazrin Shah :
  Second Class of the Royal Family Order of Selangor (DK II, 13.12.2003)

  Perlis Royal Family 
 Sultan Sirajuddin of Perlis:
   First Class of the Royal Family Order of Selangor (DK I, 14.12.2002)

  Terengganu Royal Family 
 Sultan Mizan Zainal Abidin of Terengganu (Sultan : since 15 May 1998 - Y.d-P.A. 12/2006-12/2011):
  First Class of the Royal Family Order of Selangor (DK I, 10.4.2003)to be completed ASIAN MONARCHIES

  Brunei Royal Family See also List of Malaysian Honours awarded to Heads of State and RoyalsThey have been awarded :
 Hassanal Bolkiah : 
  First Class of the Royal Family Order of Selangor (DK I, 23.11.1987)
 Mohamed Bolkiah, sultan's brother : 
  Companion of the Order of Sultan Salah ud-din 'Abdu'l Aziz Shah (SSA)

  Thai Royal Family See also List of Malaysian Honours awarded to Heads of State and Royals Queen Sirikit of Thailand : 
  First Class of the Royal Family Order of Selangor (DK I, 1999)to be completed EUROPEAN MONARCHIESto be completed if any REPUBLICS to be completed if any''

See also 
 Mirror page : List of honours of the Selangor Royal Family by country

References 

 
Selangor